Rubidium superoxide or Rubidium hyperoxide is a compound with the formula . In terms of oxidation states, the negatively charged superoxide and positively charged rubidium give it a structural formula of (Rb+)(O2−).

Chemistry
It can be created by slowly exposing elemental rubidium to oxygen gas:

Rb(s)  + O2(g)  →  RbO2(s)

Like other alkali metal hyperoxides, crystals can also be grown in liquid ammonia.

Between 280 and 360 °C, Rubidium superoxide will decompose, leaving not rubidium sesquioxide (Rb2O3), but rather rubidium peroxide (Rb2O2).

RbO2 (s) → 1/2 R2O2(s) + 1/2 O2(g)

An even more oxygen rich compound, that of rubidium ozonide (RbO3) can be created using RbO2.

Properties
Roughly speaking, RbO2 has a crystal structure similar to tetragonal calcium carbide, but is rather distorted due to the Jahn–Teller effect, which makes the crystal structure less symmetrical.

RbO2 is stable in dry air, but is extremely hygroscopic.

The compound has been studied as an example of magnetism arising intrinsically from the p-shell. RbO2 has been predicted to be a paramagnetic Mott insulator. At low temperatures, it transitions to antiferromagnetic order, with a Neel temperature of 15 K.

See also
 Rubidium sesquioxide
 Rubidium oxide

References

Rubidium compounds
Superoxides